Georgia Perakis is a Greek-American operations researcher and the William F. Pounds Professor of Operations Research and Operations Management at the Sloan School of Management, Massachusetts Institute of Technology (MIT), Cambridge, Massachusetts. Her research is primarily in the areas of dynamic pricing, revenue management and inventory control. In 2016, she was elected as a Fellow of the Institute for Operations Research and the Management Sciences (INFORMS), in recognition of her lifetime achievement in "variational inequalities, the price of anarchy, dynamic pricing and data analytics," and her "dedicated mentorship of a future generation of OR scholars."

Personal life and education 
Perakis was born and raised in Greece where she earned a bachelor's degree in mathematics from the University of Athens in 1987. She subsequently attended Brown University, where she received a master's degree in 1988 and a PhD in 1993, both in applied mathematics. She began her doctoral research under the supervision of Stella Constantine Dafermos. Following Dafermos' death in 1990, Perakis went on to work with Thomas L. Magnanti and completed her thesis titled "Geometric, Interior Point and Classical Methods for Solving Finite Dimensional Variational Inequality Problems."

Career 
Following her doctoral studies, Perakis continued in the Division of Applied Mathematics at Brown University as a visiting assistant professor. In 1995, she joined MIT as a postdoctoral associate at the Operations Research Center. In 1998, she was appointed as an assistant professor at the MIT Sloan School of Management. She was promoted to associate professor without tenure in the year 2002 and earned tenure in 2005. She became a full professor at the School in 2009. Between 2008 and 2015, she was the co-director of the MIT Sloan School of Management Leaders for Global Operations (LGO) Program. She currently serves as the faculty director of the Executive MBA program at MIT Sloan. 
In July 2019 she also became the co-director of the Operations Research Center (interdepartmental PhD and Master’s program at MIT). She holds the title of William F. Pounds Professor of Management Science as of September 2009.

Perakis currently serves on the editorial board of Management Science, Operations Research, Manufacturing & Service Operations Management and Productions and Operations Management, among others. Perakis is currently the Editor-in-Chief (EIC) of the M&SOM journal (Manufacturing & Service Operations Management). It is worth noting that Perakis will be the first female to serve as EIC of a premier journal in Operations including Management Science, Operations Research, Manufacturing & Service Operations Management and Productions and Operations Management.

Awards and recognition 
Perakis has received numerous awards and distinctions over the course of her career, including the 2000 National Science Foundation CAREER Award, the 2000 PECASE Award (Presidential Early Career Award for Scientists and Engineers) for her "outstanding research on the development of a theory for understanding the nature of traffic equilibria, and for her commitment to undergraduate and graduate education," and Faculty awards by Adobe in 2017 and IBM in 2015 and 2016. In 2016, she was elected as a Fellow of INFORMS, the highest honor of the largest society of analytics professionals.
In 2021, she was also elected as Distinguished fellow of the MSOM Society.

External links

References 

Living people
1966 births
National and Kapodistrian University of Athens alumni
Brown University alumni
Operations researchers
Fellows of the Institute for Operations Research and the Management Sciences
MIT Sloan School of Management faculty